The Charolais or Charolaise is a French breed of taurine beef cattle. It originates in, and is named for, the Charolais area surrounding Charolles, in the Saône-et-Loire department, in the Bourgogne-Franche-Comté region of eastern France. 

Charolais are raised for meat; they may be crossed with other breeds, including Angus and Hereford cattle.

History 

The Charolais is the second-most numerous cattle breed in France after the Holstein and is the most common beef breed in that country, ahead of the Limousin. At the end of 2014, France had 4.22 million head of Charolais, including 1.56 million cows, down 0.6% from a year earlier. 

The Charolais is a world breed: it is reported to DAD-IS by 68 countries, of which 37 report population data. The world population is estimated at about 730,000. The largest populations are reported from the Czech Republic and Mexico.

The breed was introduced to the southern United States from Mexico in 1934.

As the cradle of the Charolais cattle, the Charolais-Brionnais Country is applicant for the UNESCO's label as a World Heritage Site to preserve, consolidate and transmit this resource.

Characteristics

The coat ranges from white to cream-coloured; the nose is uniformly pink.

The Charbray, a cross-breed with Brahman cattle, is recognised as a breed in some countries. The Brazilian Canchim is a composite breed with 5/8 Charolais and 3/8 Indu-Brasil. Other derived breeds include Charford and Char-Swiss in the United States.

See also
 Charolais horse

References

Cattle breeds
Cattle breeds originating in France
Charolais, France